Tandridge may refer to the following places in Surrey, England:

Tandridge, Surrey, a village in the district of the same name
Tandridge District, a district of Surrey
Tandridge Hundred, a hundred in what is now Surrey